Jonathan Jones (born 6 February 1999) is a sprinter from Barbados.

He qualified for the 2020 Tokyo Olympics in 2019 when at the NCAA Outdoor Track and Field Championships, he finished fourth in the men's 400 metres final with a then-new national record time of 44.64 seconds. He won the 400 m gold medal in the 2021 NACAC U23 Championships.

While competing in the 2020 Summer Games 400m races, Jones qualified from his heat before running 45.61 to finish eighth in his semi-final.

He won the 400m final at the Big 12 Championships, held at Fuller Track & Field Stadium in Lubbock, Texas, on May 15, 2022. His time of 44.43s established a new personal best and Barbadian National record.

Jones reached the final of the 2022 World Athletics Championships with the sixth fastest time of the heats. In the final, Jones finished eighth.

At the 2022 Commonwealth Games, Jones collected a bronze medal in the Men's 400m, with a time of 44.89s.

References

External links
  (Track & Field Results Reporting System)
 
 
 

1999 births
Living people
Barbadian male sprinters
Athletes (track and field) at the 2019 Pan American Games
Pan American Games competitors for Barbados
Texas Longhorns men's track and field athletes
Athletes (track and field) at the 2020 Summer Olympics
Olympic athletes of Barbados
Commonwealth Games bronze medallists for Barbados
Commonwealth Games medallists in athletics
Athletes (track and field) at the 2022 Commonwealth Games
Medallists at the 2022 Commonwealth Games